Javaher Dasht (also Romanized as Javāher Dasht,  also Romanized as Jor Dasht) is a village in Siahkalrud Rural District, Chaboksar District, Rudsar County, Gilan Province, Iran.
 
At the 2006 census, its existence was noted, but its population was not reported.

References 

Populated places in Rudsar County